Aurangzaib Farooqi is a Pakistani Islamist Religious cleric and the current chief of the Ahle Sunnat Wal Jama'at.

Farooqi also took part in 2013 Pakistani election.

Biography

He was born on 10 November 1972 in Abbottabad, Pakistan.

After his primary education, Farooqi went to study at Jamia Faridia in Islamabad for further education, where he studied for 2 years.

He then studied at Jamia Farooqia in Karachi, where he was a student of Saleemullah Khan and Muhammad Adil Khan.

He graduated from Jamia Uloom-ul-Islamia, Banuri Town a Seminary in Karachi, where he completed the customary Dars-i Nizami.

He then served as the Imam and Khatib in various different mosques in Karachi and during this time he joined Sipah-e-Sahaba Pakistan.

In June 2014, He was made the Chief of Ahle-Sunnat-Wal-Jamat at an organizational meeting in Jhang city.

Assassination Attempts 
He survived a targeted assassination attempt, when he was leaving for court in 2012, in which six people were killed. The casualties included four policemen, his driver and a private security guard.

He survived another assassination attempt in 2015.

See also
 Ahle Sunnat Wal Jamaat 
 Azam Tariq 
 Ali Sher Hyderi
 Muhammad Ahmed Ludhianvi
 Moavia Azam Tariq

References

...

1972 births
Living people
Jamia Uloom-ul-Islamia alumni
Sipah-e-Sahaba Pakistan people